Joseph Abram Agler (June 12, 1887 – April 26, 1971) was a professional baseball player. He played all or part of three seasons in Major League Baseball between 1912 and 1915. He played mostly as a first baseman, but also played substantially in the outfield.

He made his major league debut for the Washington Senators at the end of the 1912 season. He returned to the majors with the Buffalo Buffeds in 1914, when he played in 135 games. He started the next season with Buffalo, but moved to the Baltimore Terrapins partway through the season. After the Federal League folded, Agler never returned to the majors.

Sources

Major League Baseball first basemen
Major League Baseball outfielders
Washington Senators (1901–1960) players
Buffalo Buffeds players
Buffalo Blues players
Baltimore Terrapins players
Lansing Senators players
Canton Watchmakers players
Newark Indians players
Jersey City Skeeters players
Atlanta Crackers players
Topeka Savages players
Baseball players from Ohio
1887 births
1971 deaths
People from Coshocton, Ohio